Jean-Francis Diandi alias Ramazani is an Anti-Balaka militia leader from Bria, Central African Republic.

War 
He was responsible for killing a Mauritanian peacekeeper on 4 December 2017. He was arrested on 16 March 2018 by peacekeeping forces and sent to Ngaragba prison in Bangui. In December 2020 he was released from prison and joined Coalition of Patriots for Change rebels in Bria.

References 

Living people
1990s births
Leaders of Anti-balaka